The Tesla Model 3 is a  compact executive sedan that is battery powered and produced by Tesla. Limited production of the Model 3 began in mid-2017, with the first production vehicle rolling off the assembly line on July 7, 2017. The official launch and delivery of the first 30 cars took place on July 28.

According to Tesla, the Model 3 carries full self-driving hardware, with periodic software updates adding functionality.

The Model 3 was marketed as being more affordable to more people than previous models by Tesla. Since early 2020, the Model 3 is the bestselling electric car in world history, and, in June 2021, became the first electric car to pass the 1 million global sales milestone. The Model 3 has been the world's top selling plug-in electric car (PEV) for three years running, from 2018 to 2020. It has also been the bestselling PEV in the United States for three consecutive years, 2018 to 2020, the top selling PEV in Europe in 2019, and the bestselling PEV in China in 2020.

History 

In 2008 the car was stated to be a family car. This is lower than the Tesla Model S , which, in 2014, was the lowest among the production cars of the time.

Within a week of unveiling the Model 3 in 2016, Tesla revealed they had taken 325,000 reservations for the car. By August 2017, there were 455,000 net reservations.

Industry experts were dubious when, in May 2016, Tesla announced its decision to advance its 500,000-total-unit build plan (combined for Model S, Model X, and Model 3) to 2018, two years earlier than previously planned, in order to accelerate its target for Model 3 output. As predicted, there were "production bottlenecks" and "production hell". In May 2016, Tesla issued  in new shares to the stock market to finance the plan.

The company plans for the Model 3 are part of Tesla's three-step strategy to start with a high-price vehicle and move progressively towards lower-cost vehicles, while the battery and electric drivetrain were improved and paid for through the sales of the Roadster, Model S, and Model X vehicles.

On April 18, 2018, Tesla updated its production target to 6,000 vehicles per week by the end of June 2018, an increase from its previous target of 5,000 vehicles per week which was previously promised at earlier dates. On July 1, 2018, Elon Musk announced that Tesla had met its production goal of 5,000 cars in a week.

On February 28, 2019, Tesla announced the availability of the lower-cost, highly anticipated, $35,000, Standard Range trim. However, on April 12, 2019, Tesla announced that the Standard Range model would no longer be available for ordering online, but only over the phone or in stores.  Autopilot, previously a $3,000 option, was included in all versions of the Model 3 except for the Standard Range, while each version's price only increased by $2,000. In February 2019, the Model 3 passed the Chevrolet Volt to become the all-time bestselling plug-in electric car in the U.S. Model 3 sales surpassed the Nissan Leaf in early 2020 to become the world's all-time top selling plug-in electric car.

Model naming 
The Model 3 was codenamed Tesla "BlueStar" in the original business plan in 2007. An intended name of "" was not used owing to Ford's trademark for an electric vehicle expected to be released by Ford in early 2019. Model 3, originally stylized as "Model ☰", was announced on Musk's Twitter account on July 16, 2014. A 2015-presentation by JB Straubel used the name "". Musk had wanted the three models to spell SEX, but settled for "S3X". In early 2017, after trademark opposition regarding Adidas's three stripes logo, the triplicate horizontal-bar stylization was abandoned and changed to a numeric "3".

Market 

In September 2015, Tesla announced that the  would be unveiled in March 2016. In January 2016, Musk said that the first official pictures of the car will be revealed at the end of March 2016. Delivery would begin in late 2017 first on the U.S.'s west coast and then move eastwards. Potential customers were first able to reserve a car at Tesla stores or online on March 31 with a refundable deposit of US$1000. In February 2016, Tesla indicated that the unveiling would be on March 31, 2016. Employees of Tesla and SpaceX were given early access to Model 3 reservations, and about 10,000 signed up without discount, scheduled to receive the first batch of cars. Current owners of Tesla vehicles got priority sales after employees but before the general public, as a reward for helping pay for the development of the Model 3. (Employees and current owners were likely to be more tolerant of early production flaws: both the Model S and the Model X had several problems at the start of their production, and have since improved.)

On the morning of March 31, 2016, tens of thousands of people waited in lines to place the refundable deposit to reserve a Model 3 for 2017 delivery. During the Model 3 unveiling event, Tesla said that over 115,000 people had reserved the Model 3 in less than 24 hours prior; more cars than Tesla had sold by that time. Twenty-four hours after opening reservations, Tesla had advanced orders for over 180,000 cars. Two days later, Tesla said they had 232,000 reservations. 

One week after the unveiling, Tesla said it had over 325,000 reservations, more than triple the number of Model S sedans sold by the end of 2015. Musk said that 5% of reservations correspond to the maximum of two vehicles allowed per customer, "suggesting low levels of speculation", and that 93% of Model 3 reservations are from new buyers who do not currently own a Tesla. The previous record for advance deposits on a car was the 1955 Citroën DS that had 80,000 deposits during the ten days of the Paris Auto Show, while the Model 3 had 232,000 reservations in two days.

According to Tesla's global vice-president Robin Ren, China is the second-largest market for the Model 3 after the US. Tesla said the number of net reservations totaled about 373,000 , after about 8,000 customer cancellations and about 4,200 reservations canceled by the automaker because these appeared to be duplicates from speculators. Upon its release in July 2017, there had been over 500,000 reservations for the Model 3, with Musk later clarifying there were a net of 455,000 reservations outstanding, and an average of 1,800 reservations were being added per day.

Design 

In 2013 design chief Franz von Holzhausen said that the Model 3 will "be an Audi A4, BMW 3 Series, Mercedes-Benz C-Class type of vehicle that will offer everything: range, affordability, and performance" that is targeted toward the mass market. While technology from Tesla's Model S will be used in the Model 3, it will be 20% smaller than the Model S and have its own unique design.

According to Tesla's CTO, JB Straubel, in October 2015, most Tesla engineers were working on the 3 rather than S or X. Since electric cars have lower cooling needs than combustion cars, the Model 3 does not have nor need a front grille. Musk intended for the final design to be released on June 30, 2016 but when the design was finished on July 27, it was not publicly released. After the final design of the first Model 3, any further changes would be included in future versions of the Model 3. The standard glass roof developed by Tesla Glass is made of the same glass used for Tesla's roof tiles.

In November 2020, the Model 3 was refreshed with cosmetic and internal changes, many carried over from the Model Y. The refreshed Model 3 replaced the chrome door handles, side mirror trim, window trim, and camera covers with a black finish. Double-paned front window glass, a powered trunk, new center console, and minor performance upgrades were added to all Model 3 trim levels. The car's engineering was updated to reflect Tesla's advances with the Model Y, including the introduction of a heat pump and proprietary octovalve that increases the car's heating and cooling efficiency.

Production 
, Tesla planned to increase the size of the Tesla Factory in Fremont, California, to accommodate Model 3 production.

Production stages 
In a 2013 interview, Jerome Guillen discussed "BlueStar" (codename for the Model 3 project), stating that Tesla was expecting to eventually produce 400,000 cars per year.

In May 2016 Tesla told its suppliers that it intended to double earlier-announced Model 3 production targets to 100,000 in 2017 and 400,000 in 2018 due to demand, which suppliers and many experts viewed as unattainable. In the Tesla Factory, paint lines for 500,000 automobiles commenced in 2015, and some stamping equipment for the Model 3 was operational by August 2016. Tesla bought Grohmann Engineering, experienced in automated manufacturing, in January 2017. This acquisition launched Tesla Advanced Automation Germany, which Tesla said would develop manufacturing processes to be used initially in Model 3 production.

After the two Alpha prototypes were shown (silver and black; red was a shell) in April 2016, Tesla finished the design in late July 2016. Tesla ordered parts equivalent to 300 Beta prototypes in August 2016, preparing for development of the assembly line. As of August 2016, the company intended to make release candidates for testing prior to actual production. Tesla began building Model 3 prototypes in early February 2017 as part of the testing of the vehicle design and manufacturing processes. Tesla said in late 2016 that initial crash test results had been positive. Crash test results in mid-2019 were scored at 96% for protection of adults; 86% for protection of children and 74% for the way it handles "vulnerable road users" such as pedestrians. In addition, the Model 3's "safety assist" mode scored 94%.

In October 2016 Tesla said its production timeline was on schedule. Again in February 2017, Tesla said that vehicle development, supply chain and manufacturing are on track to support volume deliveries of the Model 3 in the second half of 2017. Limited vehicle production began in July 2017 and volume production was scheduled at that time to start by September 2017. As of February 2017, Tesla planned to ramp up production to exceed 5,000 vehicles per week in Q4 2017 and reach 10,000 vehicles per week in 2018. However, Tesla missed their Q4 production target by a wide amount, as only 2,425 vehicles were produced during the entire 3-month period.

Giga Nevada had been intended to produce battery packs for Model 3 and it was announced in January 2017 that Tesla would also manufacture drive units at Giga Nevada. In February 2017, Tesla said that installation of Model 3 manufacturing equipment was underway in the Fremont factory and at Giga Nevada, where in January, production of battery cells for energy-storage products began, which have the same form factor as the cells that will be used in Model 3.

Deliveries 

In February 2016 Tesla expected to repeat the delivery schedule of the S and X models: selling at first the highest-optioned cars with higher margins, to help pay for production equipment. However, after the lessons learned from the complicated Model X production, Tesla changed its delivery schedule in early 2017 to produce relatively simpler cars initially, in order to reduce production risk. The first mass-produced Model 3 cars were rear-wheel drive with the long-range battery. Deliveries began in the second half of 2017 as predicted, but not in the numbers Tesla had hoped. As industry experts had predicted, Tesla did not meet the announced delivery targets. The first delivery was on July 7, 2017, to Musk himself and the first 30 production units were delivered on July 28, 2017.

2017 
In early July 2017 Musk forecast at least six months of serious production difficulties. Tesla's announced goal at that time was to produce 1,500 units in the third quarter of 2017, increasing to 5,000 per week by end of December 2017, but only 260 vehicles were manufactured during the third quarter. The company blamed production bottlenecks, but said there were "no fundamental issues with the Model 3 production or supply chain" and expressed confidence about its ability to resolve the bottlenecks in the near future.

Tesla delivered just 1,542 Model 3 cars in the fourth quarter of 2017, about 2,900 less than Wall Street estimations, which were already halved previously after Tesla published the company's third quarter report. By early November 2017, Musk had postponed the target date for manufacturing 5,000 of the vehicles per week from December 2017 to March 2018. An analyst with Cowan and Company, an investment banking firm, said in November 2017 that "Elon Musk needs to stop over-promising and under-delivering". Customer deliveries totaled 1,764 units in 2017.

2018 
Prior to a planned shutdown in mid-April 2018 to further increase production, Tesla produced more than 2,000 Model 3 vehicles for three straight weeks. Global deliveries passed 100,000 units as of October 2018. U.S. Model 3 sales hit 100,000 units in November 2018, reaching this milestone quicker than any previous plug-in electric model.

During the first half of 2018, the Model 3 was the top-selling alternative fuel vehicle in California with 12,674 units, followed by the Toyota Prius conventional hybrid (10,043).  The Model 3 was the top-selling plug-in electric car in the U.S. for 12 months in a row through December 2018, ending 2018 as the bestselling plug-in with an estimated 139,782 units delivered, the first time a plug-in car sold more than 100,000 units in one year. Additionally, the Model 3 ranked as the bestselling luxury vehicle in the American market in 2018. The Model 3 topped plug-in electric car sales in California in 2018, with 51,293 units registered, and was the state's best selling car in the near luxury category.

The Model 3 was the world's best selling plug-in electric car in 2018. In 2018, Elon Musk predicted that eventual global demand would likely be between 500,000 and  Model 3 cars per year— ranking in between the BMW 3 Series and the Volkswagen Golf.

2019 

Retail deliveries in Europe and China began in February 2019.  Delivery of the first right-hand drive vehicles began in June 2019, starting with the UK and later in Australia and New Zealand. Similarly to how the first US-made Model 3s were delivered in July 2017, the first Chinese-made Model 3 cars were delivered to employees at the end of 2019.

In January 2019 the Model 3 overtook the Model S as the U.S. all-time best selling all-electric car, and, the next month, also passed the Chevrolet Volt to become the all-time top selling plug-in electric car in the U.S.

The Tesla Model 3 ended 2019 as the world's best selling plug-in electric car for the second consecutive year, with just over 300,000 units delivered. The electric car also topped annual plug-in car sales in the U.S. (158,925) and California (59,514) markets for the second time in a row. And again listed as the California's best selling car in the near luxury category in 2019.

The Model 3 also ranked as the best selling plug-in car in Europe in 2019, with over 95,000 units delivered in its first year in that market, and outselling other key premium models. It also set records in Norway and the Netherlands, not only as the top selling plug-in car but also as the best selling passenger car model overall. The sales volume achieved by the Model 3 in 2019 (15,683) is the third largest in Norwegian history, exceeded only by the Volkswagen Bobla (Beetle) in 1969 (16,706), and Volkswagen Golf in 2015 (16,388). The Model 3 set a new record in the Netherlands for the highest registrations in one month (22,137) for any single plug-in vehicle in Europe.

The Model 3 also was the top selling plug-in car in Canada, Spain, Belgium, Denmark, Switzerland, Australia, New Zealand, Taiwan and Mexico.

2020 
Until 2019, the Nissan Leaf was the world's best selling plug-in electric car, with global sales of 450,000 units by December 2019. The Tesla Model 3 surpassed Leaf sales in early 2020 to become the world's best selling plug-in electric car ever. Global sales totaled about 814,000 units overall up to December 2020. The Model 3, with 365,240 global deliveries, was the world's best selling plug-in passenger car in 2020 for the third consecutive year.

In 2020, the Model 3 was the bestselling plug-in car in China (137,459) and the U.S. (95,135). The Model 3 also was the most popular plug-in electric car in California in 2020 (38,580), as well as the state's best selling car in the near luxury category. The Model 3 has topped both California's and the U.S. national plug-in car sales for three years in-a-row, from 2018 to 2020.

2021 
In 2021, the Model 3 became the all-time bestselling electric vehicle in the Netherlands with over 78,996 cars registered at the end of June 2021. The Model 3 became the first electric car to sell over 1 million units globally in June 2021.

It was also the bestselling electric vehicle of 2021 in the UK, with 34,783 registered, beating the second most popular electric car, the Kia e-Niro, by over 22,500 registrations. These figures also made the Model 3 the second bestseller in the UK new car market in 2021, only beaten by the Vauxhall Corsa, a cheaper B-segment vehicle. The 9,612 Model 3s sold in December were more than double the sales of any other car in that month.

In October 2021, Hertz car rental ordered 100,000 full-price  cars for its rental fleet.

Concerns 
In May 2018 Consumer Reports found "big flaws, such as long stopping distances in our emergency braking test and difficult-to-use controls", finding the braking distance was worse than a Ford F-150 full-size truck, and branding the Model 3 "not recommended".  Tesla responded to the claims with concern and, over the next weekend, released an OTA update for the anti-lock braking algorithm.  Consumer Reports, impressed with the prompt OTA update, verified the improved braking performance and changed their rating to a recommended model.

In February 2019 Consumer Reports revoked the Model 3 recommendation because "many customers have reported problems with the [car], including loose body trim and glass defects." As with Model S and Model X, Model 3 production flaws were reduced over time.  In November 2019 Consumer Reports reinstated the Model 3 recommendation, claiming it was the fifth-most reliable of twelve compact luxury cars.

During long-term testing of a Model 3 in December 2019, Car and Driver experienced a rear inverter short after  and 3 months of ownership.  It was their first long-term vehicle to suffer such a major failure while parked.

In 2020, due to the Covid-19 outbreak, closure of the Shanghai factory at the end of January, and supply chain issues, Tesla used the 2.5 version processor instead of the 3.0 processor that Chinese users expected to find in their vehicles. This led to mass complaints. Tesla promised to upgrade the hardware free of charge once the supply chain is restored.

The 2021 Tesla Model 3 vehicles built on or after April 27, 2021, had modified Forward Collison Warning (FCW) and Automatic Emergency Braking (AEB) safety features, resulting in lower Consumer Reports and Institute for Highway Safety (IIHS) scores. The change was from using Radar to Camera technology called Tesla Vision. The National Highway Traffic Safety Administration has opened an investigation over phantom braking in these new vehicles.

In May 2022, a relay attack was discovered where an attacker could gain remote control of a Model 3 (or a Model Y) if they could get within range of a Bluetooth key of the owner.

Specifications

Engineering and changes 
Tesla did not produce base Model 3s in 2017 or 2018. The battery uses 2170-size lithium-ion cells.

The 350-volt (nominal, 400v max) Model 3 battery packs are made of four longitudinal modules each containing the groups (bricks). The Standard Range version carries 2,976 cells arranged in 96 groups of 31. The Long Range version carries 4,416 cells arranged in 96 groups of 46, and weighs  in a 0.40 m³ volume; a density of 150 Wh/kg. The car's onboard AC/DC converter is 11 kW. In Europe this requires Three-phase electric power, otherwise single-phase power is 7.4 kW.

Tesla continues to improve the design of the 2170 battery cell and introduces incremental improvements into the manufacturing line periodically. Electrek reported in late 2018 that the improved battery cell design was needed to further reduce battery costs as Tesla was planning to begin to deliver the Model 3 Standard Range for the promised base price of  the following year.

The inverter for the Model 3 drive unit uses 24 pairs of silicon carbide (SiC) MOSFET chips rated for 650 volts each.

In July 2018 media reported that a Model 3 prototype was seen in California and Nevada while towing a trailer in an apparent evaluation of a tow bar. In May 2019 Tesla started offering an optional tow bar rated for  available with Standard Range Plus and Long Range for the European Model 3. Towing a trailer may increase consumption by 40%. Towing capacity . Towing is not available for the Performance model.

The Model 3 uses regenerative braking, which was tweaked and improved in October 2018 via a software update.

In October 2019 Tesla released a software update including a 5% power upgrade and peak power optimization to owners of the Model 3, via software version 2019.36.2.1, which showed noticeable improvements in acceleration and overall speed. In December 2019, Tesla offered Long Range dual-motor Model 3 owners who had software version 2019.40.2 the option to purchase a US$2000 "Acceleration Boost" software upgrade enabling a Sport driving mode, advertised to reduce 0- time from 4.4s to 3.9s.  Road testing confirmed better-than-expected acceleration with drivers in Sport mode reaching 0- in 3.67s from standstill and 3.47s with a 1-foot rollout.

Structurally, the Model 3 is mostly steel, and most body panels are aluminum.

The  width was chosen to fit with automated parking systems in Japan. Due to its smaller size, the Model 3 is expected to consume less energy than the Model Y, and thus have longer range.

Traditional stability control is not made for dual-motor control or the faster response time in electric motors, and Tesla modified the control unit. The motors have magnets arranged in a Halbach array. The cooling system is integrated to reduce size and cost.

Sometime during August 2020, Tesla added heating hardware to the Model 3's charge port which was enabled by software update later in the year to prevent ice buildup.

Specifications table

Safety 
Following crash testing in 2019, the Model 3 performed very well, receiving five stars in every category from the National Highway Traffic Safety Administration and a 94% Euro NCAP score in active safety.

Reception 

 Car-design columnist and former car designer for GM Robert Cumberford said the Model 3 "is an excellent design" and praised the front fascia skin that he thinks is superior to the black plastic simulated grille of the pre-refresh Model S. Cumberford praised the Model 3's minimalist design, and "elegant simplicity" akin to Apple products. Although he criticized the car's spoiler, he said the Model 3 has a design that would age well, and "in 10 years it will still look contemporary and beautifully understated, not old and irrelevant."
 Motor Trend said the nose was controversial and polarizing, but probably intentionally so. Vanity Fair and others compared the Model 3 to the Ford Model T for its intended affordability as a volume-produced electric vehicle and for its limited set of options, namely range, wheels and exterior color of which all but white costs extra. Automotive journalist Doug DeMuro said the Model 3 was better, though $2,000 more expensive, than the BMW 340i and that it was the "coolest car of the year," later clarifying that this was based on the "long waiting lists, obsessive interest and news stories." Alex Roy said that DeMuro's review had concentrated on hardware details and missed out on the bigger picture.
 Automotive-industry analyst Toni Sacconaghi of AllianceBernstein said after driving one of the early Tesla vehicles in November 2017 that "Overall, we found the Model 3 to be a compelling offering, and believe it is likely to further galvanize the overall Electric Vehicle category." He was less impressed with build quality of the test samples. "Fit and finish on the two demo cars we saw—perhaps not surprisingly—was relatively poor." He said that there were quality issues at first with the Model X which led to some concern. "This is going to be a much, much higher-volume car, and if there are any quality issues, that could overwhelm the service centers and undermine the Tesla brand." Nonetheless, Sacconaghi was impressed with the ride quality, performance and interior space, and concluded that the 3 "risks cannibalizing the [much more expensive] Model S going forward."
 Road & Tracks Bob Sorokanich said the "Model 3 proves that Tesla is thinking far beyond the edges of the Model S and X. Stepping out of the 3, you realize that, as far as the S and X pushed the envelope, they were always meant as intermediaries, stepping stones designed to draw people away from comfortable convention and into the future of the automobile. ... The Model 3 is Tesla at its most unabashed. It's an automaker finally willing to abandon the skeuomorphism of a false radiator grille, the tradition of a driver-oriented gauge panel."
 In 2018, a Model 3 was driven 606.2 miles (975 km) on a single charge, setting a hypermiling driving record.
 In early 2019, Kelley Blue Book announced that the Tesla Model 3 was the winner of the "Best Resale Value Award" for all automobiles in the US market "with a projected 69.3% resale value after 36 months and 48.7% after 60 months."

Awards 
 Popular Mechanics named the Tesla Model 3 as the magazine's 2018 Car of the Year. Model 3 was given the 2018 Design of the Year award by Automobile magazine.
 In the United Kingdom, the Model 3 was named 2019 Car of the Year by Auto Express magazine, and 2020 Car of the Year by Parkers magazine, where it was also named "Best Electric Car" and "Best Company Car", and won the "Best Safety" award for any vehicle on the market.
 The Model 3 won best mid-size car in the 2019 Das Goldene Lenkrad Golden Steering Wheel awards.
 The Model 3 was named the top-rated electric car of 2019 by Edmunds.com, as well as being named Edmunds' top-rated Luxury Electric Vehicle for 2020.
 In late 2019, the Model 3 was also named a Top Safety Pick+ by the IIHS. The Model 3 also won Car of the Year in Denmark, Car of the Year 2020 in Norway, and Swiss Car of the Year 2020.
 The Model 3 was named as UK Car of the Year 2020 by a panel of 29 motoring journalists. The director of the awards stated that the car's "technology, performance and range" were converting opinions in favor of electric vehicles.
 The car was chosen as one of the Top 10 Tech Cars by the IEEE in 2018.
 In January 2021, the Model 3 Standard Range Plus was named Large Electric Car of the Year by What Car? magazine. What Car? awarded the Model 3 five stars out of five in its review of the car.
 In May 2021, the Model 3 won Auto Trader UK's New Car Award for Best Car for Families. Auto Trader awarded the Model 3 four and a half stars out of five in its review of the car.

Recalls 
 In December 2021, 356,309 2017–2020 Model 3 vehicles were recalled because of the possibility of damage to the rear view camera wiring harness caused by trunk operation.

See also 
 Government incentives for electric vehicles have been established by authorities around the world
 List of electric cars currently available
 List of modern production plug-in electric vehicles
 List of production battery electric vehicles
 List of Easter eggs in Tesla products
 Tesla Supercharger

References

External links 

 

2020s cars
All-wheel-drive vehicles
Cars introduced in 2016
Compact executive cars
Electric car models
Electric cars
Production electric cars
Rear-wheel-drive vehicles
Sports sedans
ANCAP large family cars
Euro NCAP large family cars
Model 3